The 2022–23 Oral Roberts Golden Eagles women's basketball represent Oral Roberts University in the 2022–23 NCAA Division I women's basketball season. The Golden Eagles, led by first year head coach Kelsi Musick, compete in the Summit League. They play home games in Mabee Center in Tulsa, Oklahoma.

Previous season
The Golden Eagles went 16–15 overall and 10–8 in conference play, finishing fourth.

Oral Roberts played North Dakota in the quarterfinals won 61-54. At the semifinals played the regular season champion South Dakota State and lost 53-72. On March 30, 2022 Misti Cussen and the team parted ways after 10 seasons. On April 21 Golden Eagles appointed new head coach Kelsi Musick, who led the Division II member Southwestern Oklahoma State team the past 13 seasons.

Offseason
After coach Cussen left the team, her assistants also left the Golden Eagles. Assistant coach Jeff Zinn replaced Kelsi Musick at the SWOSU. Assistant Lee Mayberry became head coach Oklahoma Class 3A Cascia Hall high school boys team.

Departures

Additions

2022 recruiting class

2023 recruiting class

Preseason

Summit League Preseason poll
The Summit League Preseason poll and other preseason awards was released on October 11, 2022, with the Golden Eagles selected to finish in third place in the Summit League.

Preseason All-Summit teams
The Golden Eagles had one player selected to the preseason all-Summit teams.

First team

Tirzah Moore

Roster

Schedule

|-
!colspan=9 style=| Exhibition

|-
!colspan=9 style=| Non-conference regular season (3-8)

|-
!colspan=9 style=| Summit League regular season (8-10)

|-
!colspan=9 style=| Summit League Women's Tournament (1-1)

Source:

Awards and honors

References

Oral Roberts Golden Eagles women's basketball seasons
Oral Roberts
Oral Roberts
Oral Roberts